A parazonium is a long triangular dagger, wide at the hilt end and coming to a point. In Roman mythology, it is frequently carried by Virtus, particularly in early representations. It is also sometimes carried by Mars, or Roma, or the emperor, giving them the aura of courage.

In Roman statuary, the weapon is cradled in the bearer's left arm or, on Trajan's Column, for example, it is stuck into the left side of the officer's chest band.  Existing examples on statuary show that the parazonium's scabbard shape is a direct copy of the few existing Greek parazonia on display at various Greek museums.  The weapon's hilt, grip, and pommel are not copies of the Greek style.  The pommel cap is either an eagle's head or a bi-lobed pommel.  The details of the hand grip on the statues are no longer clear after 2,000 years.  The guards, contrary to some reports, are authentic and are a rather theatrical "S" shape with inset detail.

The Roman parazonium blade tended to be leaf shape and approximately 15"-19" long.  The use of the Roman parazonium tended to be somewhat theatrical in the sense that it was a mark of rank and it was used to rally the troops. It appears the normal procedure was for the officer to exchange his parazonium for a gladius or a spatha if he was directly threatened during a battle.

See also
Flag and seal of Virginia

References

Roman swords
Daggers
Ancient weapons